Jamalpur may refer to:

Bangladesh
 Jamalpur, Bangladesh
 Jamalpur District
 Jamalpur Sadar Upazila
 Jamalpur Government College, Bangladesh
 Jamalpur Medical College, affiliated with the University of Dhaka, Bangladesh
 Jamalpur Stadium, Jamalpur, Bangladesh
 Jamalpur Zila School, a public high school in Jamalpur District and one of the oldest schools in Bangladesh

India
 Jamalpur, Gujarat, a village in Ahmedabad district

Bihar
 Jamalpur, Bihar, a suburb and municipality in the Munger district of Bihar
 Jamalpur, Bihar Assembly constituency, a legislative assembly of Bihar, India
 Jamalpur Junction, station code JMP, serving the Munger-Jamalpur twin cities in Munger, Bihar
 Jamalpur Gymkhana, a hostel for young apprentice officers of the Indian Railways
 Jamalpur Locomotive Workshop, in India, set up by the East Indian Railway

Haryana
 Jamalpur, Bhiwani, a village in the Bhiwani district of Haryana
 Jamalpur, Haryana, a village in Yamunanagar district

Uttar Pradesh
 Jamalpur, Jaunpur, a village in the Jaunpur district of Uttar Pradesh
 Jamalpur (Mirzapur district), a village in Mirzapur district in Uttar Pradesh of India
 Jamalpur Mahavidyalaya, college in Jamalpur in Purba Bardhaman district, India
 Jamalpur Karaundi, a village in Raebareli district of Uttar Pradesh

West Bengal
 Jamalpur (community development block), West Bengal
 Jamalpur, Bardhaman, a village with a police station and CD block headquarters, in Bardhaman district, West Bengal, India
 Jamalpur, West Bengal Assembly constituency, an assembly constituency in West Bengal

Pakistan
 Jamalpur (Bahawalpur), a town in Bahawalpur District, Punjab